This list comprises all players who have participated in at least one league match for New Hampshire Phantoms in the USL since the league began keeping detailed records in 2003. Players who were on the roster but never played a first team game are not listed; players who appeared for the team in other competitions (US Open Cup, etc.) but never actually made an USL appearance are noted at the bottom of the page where appropriate.

A "*" indicates a player known to have appeared for the team prior to 2003.

A
  Mustapha Achab
  Ryan Ackerman
  Michael Adam
  Nik Allen
  Joe Annese
  Roldege Arius

B
  Chris Banks
  Almir Barbosa
  Jake Beverlin
  Steve Bonnell
  Clint Borrill
 Markus Bergendorff
  Henry Brauner
  Brandon Briggs
  Manny Brito
  Romelle Burgess
  Preston Burpo*

C
  Michael Cabral
  Paul Cleary
  Michael Cafeteiro
  Sean Carey
  Ricky Charles
  Jim Cherneski*
  Joseph Clancy
  Joshua Cole
  Sean Coleman
  Joe Corsello
  Daniel Cripe
  Cesar Cuellar
  Paulo Cunha
  Brandon Curran
  Jonathan Curran

D
  Anthony D'Angelo
  Matthew Delaney
  Marc Djessouho
  Timothy Doenmez
  Seamus Donnelly
  Robert Dow
  Bradbury Downing
  Adrian Dubois
  Marcos Eskilo DeOliveira

E
  James Earle
  Paulson Edum
  Alfredo Esteves
  David Evans

F
  Michael Feely
  Narciso Lima Fernandes
  Richard Fleming

G
  Johany Gallego
  Diego Garcia
  Anthony Gass
  Patrick Gay (soccer)
  Chris Gilbert
  Matt Glode
  Miguel Gonzalez
  James Goodwin
  Steven Gould
  James Greenslit
  Josh Grenier

H
  Patrick Hamilton
  Bjorn Hansen
  Oliver Harker-Smith
  Rensen Haynes
  Tom Heimreid
  Rafael Henckel
  Danny Hernandez
  Bruno Herrera
  Marc Hubbard

J
  Tyler Jackson
  Dustin Jamiesou-Strazdas
  Keneil Jones
  Brendan Joseph

K
  Ted Kakambourus
  Jason Karalexis
  Tony Kasulinous*
  Richard Kentish
  Omar Khartabil
  Ebbie Kodiat
  Neil Krause
  Nathan Krinsky

L
  Craig Lamy
  Ethan Lapierre
  Jeff Larentowicz
  Ryan Levesque
  Brian Levey
  Seth Lilburn
  Chris Loftus
  Ulysses Lonzetti

M
  Barnaba Madol
  Mark Manganello
  Pumelele Maqubela
  Eric Masi
  Jon Mayo
  Shane McCarran
  Thomas McNeil
  Adrian Melville
  Gabriel Mercier
  John Miller
  Christopher Mitchell
  Enilson Moncao
  Ryan Moore
  Philippe-Andre Moreau
  Michael Murphy
  Timothy Murray

N
  Alessandro Neto
  David Nordmark

O
  Keiran O'Brien
  Charlie Ober

P
  Vincent Palumbo
  Vincent Papageorgiou
  Joseph Parrish
  Matthew Parsons
  Larry Pokrywa
  James Proctor

R
  Kevin Radziwon
  Alex Redding
  Scott Rowling

S
  Sergio Saccoccio
  Michael Santangelo
  Benjamin Secord
  Adrian Schippers
  Richard Simmons
  Zach Simmons
  Dushawne Simpson
  Kyle Singer
  Ryan Spicer
  Derek Stenquist
  Guil Salgado
  Craig Stewart
  Tomas Szczypiorski

T
  Tsuyoshi Tanikawa
  Shaun Taylor
  Val Teixeira
  Oumar Thiam
  Edward Thompson
  Michael Todesca
  Nicola Todesca
  T. J. Tomasso
  Nicholas Tornaritis
  Jan Trnka-Amrhein
  Phillip Tuttle
  Joey Twum-Barima

U
  Kyle Urso
  Benjamin Utter

V
  Jhony Valencia
  Robrecht Vanrykel
  Luke Vercollone
  Bruno Victal-Menezes

W
  Max White
  Patrick White
  Jamie Williams
  Kevin Woods

Sources

2010 New Hampshire Phantoms stats
2009 New Hampshire Phantoms stats
2008 New Hampshire Phantoms stats
2007 New Hampshire Phantoms stats
2006 New Hampshire Phantoms stats
2005 New Hampshire Phantoms stats
2004 New Hampshire Phantoms stats

References

New Hampshire Phantoms
 
Association football player non-biographical articles